Estonian Cup 1993–94 was the third season of the Estonian football knockout tournament.

1st round

2nd round

Quarter-finals

Semi-finals

Final

Estonian Cup seasons
Cup
Cup
Estonian